"Little Bit of Love", also known as "A Little Bit of Love", is a song and single by English rock band, Free. Written by the four members of the band, it reached number 13 on the UK's Official UK singles chart and stayed in the charts for 10 weeks. The British Record Mirror said of the song on 13 May 1972, "Having had their fair share of the knocks and problems of fame, Free are back in full swing again. An album on the way – and this single, which should do them a lot of good. It's a relaxed put together production, good lead voice, solid beat – a philosophic song and easy to pick up in the mind. Plus that very distinctive sound." The American Record World on 27 May 1972 said "the strongest singles of the week come from Free, ("Little Bit Of Love" on Island)...". 

After the single was released, it appeared on Free's fifth studio album Free at Last. Since then it has appeared on a number of compilation albums, such as The Free Story, Completely Free and The Best of Free: All Right Now etc.

Song name
The single was released in the United Kingdom on 5 May 1972 as "Little Bit of Love", however not all releases had exactly the same name, for instance, in German, France, Spain, etc. it was released as "A Little Bit of Love".

Personnel
 Paul Rodgers – vocals
 Paul Kossoff – lead guitar
 Andy Fraser – bass guitar
 Simon Kirke – drums

See also
List of songs recorded by Free

References 

 

1972 songs
1972 singles
Free (band) songs
Island Records singles
Songs written by Andy Fraser
Songs written by Paul Rodgers